St. Andrew's Episcopal Church is a historic Carpenter Gothic Episcopal Church  built in 1871 and located at the corner of Church Street and St. Andrew's in Clinton, Louisiana.

Parts of the 1958 movie, The Long, Hot Summer, which starred Paul Newman, Lee Remick and Joanne Woodward, were filmed at the church. St. Andrew's Episcopal Church is still an active parish in the Episcopal Diocese of Louisiana.

The church was listed on the National Register of Historic Places on June 21, 1984.

The congregation meets at 9 A.M. each Sunday for Holy Eucharist three Sundays a month and Morning Prayer on the other Sunday(s). Coffee and fellowship follow immediately in the parish hall. All are welcome.

The church is located at 11015 Church St., Clinton, LA 70722. The phone number is (225) 683-5498.

See also

National Register of Historic Places listings in East Feliciana Parish, Louisiana

References

External links
 Clinton Walking Tour accessed April 6, 2013
 A Southerly Flow: St. Andrew's Episcopal Church, Clinton, Louisiana, photo and text accessed April 6, 2013

Churches on the National Register of Historic Places in Louisiana
Episcopal church buildings in Louisiana
Carpenter Gothic church buildings in Louisiana
Churches in East Feliciana Parish, Louisiana
Churches completed in 1871
19th-century Episcopal church buildings
National Register of Historic Places in East Feliciana Parish, Louisiana